An edge case is a problem or situation that occurs only at an extreme (maximum or minimum) operating parameter.  For example, a stereo speaker might noticeably distort audio when played at maximum volume, even in the absence of any other extreme setting or condition.

An edge case can be expected or unexpected. In engineering, the process of planning for and gracefully addressing edge cases can be a significant task, and yet this task may be overlooked or underestimated.

Non-trivial edge cases can result in the failure of an object that is being engineered. They may not have been foreseen during the design phase, and they may not have been thought possible during normal use of the object. For this reason, attempts to formalize good engineering standards often include information about edge cases.

Software engineering
In programming, an edge case typically involves input values that require special handling in an algorithm behind a computer program.  As a measure for validating the behavior of computer programs in such cases, unit tests are usually created; they are testing boundary conditions of an algorithm, function or method. A series of edge cases around each "boundary" can be used to give reasonable coverage and confidence using the assumption that if it behaves correctly at the edges, it should behave everywhere else.

For example, a function that divides two numbers might be tested using both very large and very small numbers. This assumes that if it works for both ends of the magnitude spectrum, it should work correctly in between.

See also

 Corner case, an issue that occurs only when multiple environmental conditions are simultaneously at extreme (maximum or minimum) levels
 Forensic engineering
 Fuzzing
 Random testing
 Happy path

References

Engineering concepts
Usability
Technical communication
Software testing